Villasur de Herreros is a municipality located in the province of Burgos, Castile and León, Spain.

According to the 2004 census (INE), the municipality had a population of 318 inhabitants.

References

Municipalities in the Province of Burgos